The Thomas Harriot College of Arts and Sciences is the liberal arts college at East Carolina University. Its Departments comprise courses of study in mathematics, the natural sciences, the social sciences, and the humanities.

In 1941, the Board of Trustees approved an undergraduate degree program in liberal arts disciplines for students wanting to pursue a non-teaching degree. When East Carolina College was elevated to university status in 1967, the School of Arts and Sciences became the College of Arts and Sciences, the home of the liberal arts. The school is named for Thomas Harriot, a cartographer, historian, and surveyor who took part in Sir Walter Raleigh's second expedition to Virginia.

Organization
The Departments of the College are: 
Anthropology
Biology
Chemistry
Economics
English
Foreign Languages and Literatures
Geography
Geology
History
Mathematics
Philosophy
Physics
Political Science
Psychology
Sociology
Urban and Regional Planning

There are interdisciplinary programs in:
Asian studies
African and African-American studies
Classical studies
Coastal and marine studies
The Great Books
Institute for Historical and Cultural Research (IHCR)
International studies
Medieval and Renaissance studies
North Carolinian studies
Religious studies
Russian studies
Security studies
Women's studies

External links
Official website

East Carolina University divisions
Liberal arts colleges at universities in the United States